Cyrteumenes is a  Malagasy genus of potter wasps. It contains the following species:
 Cyrteumenes floricola (Saussure, 1890)
 Cyrteumenes mochii Borsato, 1999
 Cyrteumenes seyrigi (Giordani Soika, 1934)

References

Potter wasps